Warmensteinach is a municipality in the district of Bayreuth in Bavaria in Germany.
From here there is a chairlift, the Ochsenkopf South Chairlift, to the summit of the Ochsenkopf, the second highest mountain in the Fichtelgebirge.

References

Bayreuth (district)